A space traveller is a person who travels into or through outer space.

Space traveller may also refer to:
 Astronaut, a professional space traveller
 Space tourist, unofficial term for a non-professional space traveller
 Spaceflight participant, official term for a non-professional space traveller